The  New York Giants season was the franchise's 51st season in the National Football League. The Giants finished with a 5–9 record that was nonetheless a three-win improvement upon their performance at the Yale Bowl in 1974. They played their home games at Shea Stadium in Flushing Meadows, Queens, and had a new logo on their helmet, replacing the old lower case “ny” to a stylized white and blue uppercase “NY”. Like Shea Stadium, this uppercase "NY" logo lasted for just this season only.

Offseason

NFL Draft

Roster

Regular season

Schedule 

Note: Intra-division opponents are in bold text.

Standings

Game summaries

Week 5: at Buffalo Bills

See also 
 List of New York Giants seasons

References 

Sources
 New York Giants on Pro Football Reference
 Giants on jt-sw.com

New York Giants seasons
New York Giants
New York Giants season
1970s in Queens